The Kung Fu Master (洪熙官) is a 1994 Hong Kong martial arts television series directed by Benny Chan and starring Donnie Yen as the titular protagonist. Produced by ATV and TVB, the series aired on its channel ATV Home and TVB Jade from 16 August to 23 September 1994.

Synopsis
The story is based on the historic martial artist and legend Hung Hei-gun (Donnie Yen) in the Qing dynasty.  In the final stand Hung Hei-gun and Fong Sai-yuk (Nick Cheung) fight their way to defend the Shaolin Monastery against the invading army of the Qianlong Emperor who was trying to remove any opposition because he didn’t want to reveal that he wasn’t a true Manchu.

Cast

References

Asia Television original programming
Hong Kong action television series
Martial arts television series
Historical television series
1994 Hong Kong television series debuts
1994 Hong Kong television series endings
1990s Hong Kong television series
Cantonese-language television shows
Qianlong Emperor